Beniamino Bonomi (born 9 March 1968) is an Italian sprint canoeist who competed from the late 1980s to the mid-2000s (decade). Competing in five Summer Olympics, he won four medals with one gold (2000: K-2 1000 m) and three silvers (1996: K-1 1000 m, K-2 500 m; 2004: K-2 1000 m).

Biography
Bonomi also won seven medals at the ICF Canoe Sprint World Championships with a gold (K-2 500 m: 1995) and six silvers (K-1 1000 m: 1997, K-1 10000 m: 1991, K-2 200 m: 1997, 1998; K-2 500 m: 1997, K-4 200 m: 1998).

He was member of the Gruppo Nautico Fiamme Gialle club. He is 181 cm (5'11") tall and races at 81 kg (180 lbs).

References

External links
 
 

1968 births
Living people
People from Verbania
Canoeists at the 1988 Summer Olympics
Canoeists at the 1992 Summer Olympics
Canoeists at the 1996 Summer Olympics
Canoeists at the 2000 Summer Olympics
Canoeists at the 2004 Summer Olympics
Italian male canoeists
Olympic canoeists of Italy
Olympic gold medalists for Italy
Olympic silver medalists for Italy
Olympic medalists in canoeing
Canoeists of Fiamme Gialle
ICF Canoe Sprint World Championships medalists in kayak
Medalists at the 2004 Summer Olympics
Medalists at the 2000 Summer Olympics
Medalists at the 1996 Summer Olympics
Mediterranean Games medalists in canoeing
Mediterranean Games gold medalists for Italy
Competitors at the 1997 Mediterranean Games
Sportspeople from the Province of Verbano-Cusio-Ossola
20th-century Italian people